= David Patronella =

American politician

Member of the Texas House of Representatives from the 138th district
- In office January 11, 1983 – February 2, 1989
- Preceded by: District created
- Succeeded by: Ken VanderVoort

Personal details
- Party: Democratic

David Patronella is an American politician who served in the Texas House of Representatives from the 138th district from 1983 to 1989.
